Jorge Reyna (born 10 January 1963) is a retired male triple jumper from Cuba who won a silver medal at the 1989 World Indoor Championships in Budapest.

His personal best jump was 17.48 metres, achieved in February 1987 in Santiago de Cuba. This result places him sixth on the all-time Cuban performers list, behind Yoelbi Quesada, Lázaro Betancourt, Aliecer Urrutia, Yoandri Betanzos and Alexander Martínez.

Achievements

References

1963 births
Living people
Cuban male triple jumpers
Athletes (track and field) at the 1983 Pan American Games
Athletes (track and field) at the 1987 Pan American Games
Pan American Games gold medalists for Cuba
Pan American Games medalists in athletics (track and field)
Central American and Caribbean Games bronze medalists for Cuba
Competitors at the 1982 Central American and Caribbean Games
World Athletics Indoor Championships medalists
Central American and Caribbean Games medalists in athletics
Medalists at the 1983 Pan American Games
20th-century Cuban people